Jugsalai  Assembly constituency is an assembly constituency in the Indian state of Jharkhand.

Overview
According to the Delimitation of Parliamentary and Assembly Constituencies Order, 2008 of the Election Commission of India, Jugsalai Assembly constituency covers Jugsalai police station (excluding Bagbera town and Karandih-Purihasa, Hargarghutu, Bagbera gram panchayats and Kitadih village), Golmuri and Patamda police stations . It is a reserved constituency for Scheduled Castes. Jugsalai (Vidhan Sabha constituency) is a part of Jamshedpur (Lok Sabha constituency).

Members of Assembly 
2005: Dulal Bhuiyan, Jharkhand Mukti Morcha
2009: Ram Chandra Sahis, All Jharkhand Students Union
2014: Ram Chandra Sahis, All Jharkhand Students Union
2019: Mangal Kalindi, Jharkhand Mukti Morcha

Election Results

2019

See also
Vidhan Sabha
List of states of India by type of legislature

References

Assembly constituencies of Jharkhand